A spoiler is an element of a disseminated summary or description of any narrative that reveals plot elements, with the implication that the experience of discovering the plot naturally, as the creator intended it, has been spoiled. Typically, the details of the conclusion of the plot, including the climax and ending, are especially regarded as spoiler material. Plot twists are also prone to spoilers.

More broadly, the term can also be used to refer to any piece of information, regarding any part of a given media, that a potential consumer was not intended to know beforehand.

History
One of the first print uses of the term was in the April 1971 issue of National Lampoon, in which an article by Doug Kenney entitled "Spoilers" revealed the endings of famous films and movies. Kenney wrote: "Spoilers! What are they? Simply the trick ending to every mystery novel and movie you’re ever liable to see. Saves time and money!"

The term spoiler was introduced in the early days of the Internet, and came to prominence in newsgroup conversations. It is still common in internet articles and social media discussions. Early rules of netiquette insisted that spoilers could and should be normally avoided, but if the posting of "spoiling" information was unavoidable, it be preceded by a warning such as "SPOILER ALERT", or the spoiler itself has to be masked so that it can not be visible to any but those keen for details and not fazed at the thought of such potentially plot-revealing information.

Sometimes, these warnings are omitted, accidentally or deliberately, and some unwitting readers have had literature, films, television programmes and other works that they were looking forward to experiencing "spoiled".

Website policies and features
Wikipedia discloses spoilers in its articles without giving advance warning, although it previously did give such warning before 2006. Mathew Prichard, the grandson of Agatha Christie, criticized Wikipedia for giving away spoilers in the play The Mousetrap. Andrew Jarecki, the producer of the documentary Catfish, argued that Wikipedia should have spoiler alerts. The ending had been posted on Wikipedia before its theatrical release because the film had been shown at the 2010 Sundance Film Festival. Jay Walsh, a Wikimedia Foundation spokesperson, said that Wikipedia is intended to be an exhaustive knowledge source, so it would have spoilers.

Some internet forums and reference sites, such as the IMDb FAQ section, have optional spoiler tags covering major plot details. The information underneath may be revealed by highlighting the text or, in the case of IMDb, rolling over the spoiler tag.

There are some applications that prevent users from reading spoilers, such as TVShow Time's Google Chrome extension, which, once set up, blocks posts on social media about episodes that the user has not seen.

On Usenet, the common method for obscuring spoiler information is to precede it with many blank lines known as 'spoiler space' – traditionally enough to push the information in question on to the next screen of a 25-line terminal. A simple cipher called ROT13 is also used in newsgroups to obscure spoilers, but is rarely used for this purpose elsewhere.

Most discussion websites provide a means of tagging certain threads as containing spoilers for those who wish to discuss a fictional work in depth, including the outcomes of events and the handling of the narrative resolution. Social media platforms, like Twitter and Tumblr, allow their users to tag posts with spoiler content using hashtags that can then be placed in a user's blacklist to avoid spoiler discussions during and after the work has come out, until they have consumed the work or media.

Some have felt compelled to avoid participating on public websites altogether, set up "closed" websites to exclude those who are sensitive about spoilers, or decided they had to unilaterally blog at the expense of public exchange.

Psychological effect
In 2011, Nicholas Christenfeld and Jonathan Leavitt of UC San Diego did a psychological experiment testing whether spoilers diminish enjoyment of fiction. They gave subjects short stories with twist endings to read, giving some of the subjects information about the twist in advance. For nearly every story, subjects who had the story "spoiled" enjoyed the story more than the subjects who didn't know the ending in advance.

The spoiling of James Holzhauer's loss on Jeopardy!, which was reported upon by both print and Internet sources hours before it aired on most of the show's stations, had a somewhat unexpectedly positive impact on that episode's ratings. Instead of ruining the outcome, the spoilers had teased just enough to encourage viewers to tune in to see how the previously dominant Holzhauer was beaten. Jeopardy! does not contractually require its audience members to remain silent in regard to spoilers; members have generally followed the honor system in not leaking spoilers before episodes air.

Reactions

Writers and directors
The end credits to Henri-Georges Clouzot's 1955 film Les Diaboliques includes a card with an early anti-spoiler message from the director:

Similarly, Alfred Hitchcock asked audiences not to reveal the ending of his 1960 thriller Psycho, saying "Please don't give away the ending, it's the only one we have."

In an interview about his Dark Tower series (appearing in issue #4 of the 2007 Marvel Comic adaptation The Gunslinger Born), Stephen King was asked if there are spoilers in the first few novels that would ruin someone's experience of the comic. "There are no spoilers!", King replied, "You might as well say 'I'm never gonna watch Wizard of Oz again because I know how it comes out'". Later, in 2014, King was widely criticized for revelling in a major character's demise in HBO's Game of Thrones on Twitter, only moments after the episode's airing, thus revealing a plot twist for non-live and offshore audiences. King responded by commenting the end of Shakespeare's Romeo and Juliet, and the death of the eponymous protagonists. He echoed the incident in a talk with the author and screenplay writer of the scene, George R. R. Martin in 2016, summing it up as "You can't spoil a book!", followed by impromptu plot revelations for seminal works, including Citizen Kane.

In April 2015, the Under the Gun Theater created Swarm of Spoilers, a parody show based on George R.R. Martin's Game of Thrones series. The comedic play recapped the previous four seasons of the HBO television show. Kevin Mullaney, who directed Swarm of Spoilers, stated: "I'm somebody who's very sensitive about spoilers, so I wanted to make sure it was very clear from the title," though he went on to say, "There's actually this theory about spoilers that we think that they hurt the enjoyment of shows, and I definitely feel that way sometimes, but I think there's been studies that show the other side: that when we know the ending of a story that we haven't read before, it actually enhances the story, so I don't know if it would actually hurt anyone to come see it [Swarm of Spoilers]."  The final production included 45 of the series' characters, and was played by an 18-person ensemble.

Film studios
Some producers actively seed bogus information in order to misdirect fans. The director of the film Terminator Salvation orchestrated a "disinformation campaign" where false spoilers were distributed about the film, to mask any true rumors about its plot.

The market campaigns for Marvel Studios' Avengers: Infinity War and its sequel Avengers: Endgame extensively promoted the maintenance of secrecy regarding the films' plots, with the latter's social media campaign including a hashtag (#DontSpoilTheEndgame), a signed letter from the Russo brothers and a video featuring the film's ensemble cast demanding that earlier viewers of the film refrain from spoiling the plot.

Film critics

In 2005, the Chicago Sun-Times film critic Roger Ebert wrote an article entitled "Critics have no right to play spoiler" which contained spoilers and spoilers warnings. Ebert wrote:

The characters in movies do not always do what we would do. Sometimes they make choices that offend us. That is their right. It is our right to disagree with them. It is not our right, however, to destroy for others the experience of being as surprised by those choices as we were. A few years ago, I began to notice "spoiler warnings" on Web-based movie reviews -- a shorthand way of informing the reader that a key plot point was about to be revealed. Having heard from more than a few readers accusing me of telling too much of the story, I began using such warnings in my reviews.

Ebert used two spoiler warnings in the article, saying "If you have not yet seen Million Dollar Baby and know nothing about the plot, read no further" and later said, "Now yet another spoiler warning, because I am going to become more explicit." Ebert discussed six films in the article and mentioned how many critics handled The Crying Game and also noted a detail about the film The Year of Living Dangerously. Ebert also mentioned two films alongside Million Dollar Baby.

Ebert additionally criticized two commentators, Rush Limbaugh and Michael Medved (the latter of whom had "for a long time been a political commentator, not a movie critic"), for deliberately revealing the ending of the movie due to a moral disagreement with the lead character's life decision. "[S]hould no movie be allowed to consider [the moral issue]?" Ebert asked. "The separation of church and state in America was wisely designed to prevent religions from dictating the personal choices of those who do not share the same beliefs."

Artists
In an art exhibition at the Museo de Arte Contemporaneous de Monterrey (Mexico) artist Mario Garcia Torres presented a series of works titled Spoiler Paintings in which spoilers of mostly Hollywood films were written on large color canvases.

See also
 Film criticism
 Film trailer
 Teaser trailer
 Broadcast delay
 In medias res

References

External links
 "Spoilers Don’t Spoil Anything" -(Jonah Lehrer, Wired)
 Spoilers: The Official Vulture Statutes of Limitations - New York Magazine.

Websites examples
 Spoiler.io is a random spoiler website.
 Themoviespoiler is a movie description website.

Entertainment
Mass media
Secrecy